Santos Montano is a drummer from Santa Fe, New Mexico. He is known for playing on the first album of the post-metal band Zozobra and for being a founding member and the drummer of post-metal band Old Man Gloom. In addition to his music career, he is working as part of an art department in the movie industry. He has worked for both series productions (e.g. Marvel's Daredevil, released in 2015) as well as for movie productions (e.g. Night at the Museum: Secret of the Tomb). He has also written one op-ed for Pitchfork.

Discography

With Zozobra
 Harmonic Tremors (Hydra Head Records, 2007)

With Old Man Gloom

Studio albums
Meditations in B (1999, Tortuga)
Seminar II: The Holy Rites of Primitivism Regressionism (2001, Tortuga)
Seminar III: Zozobra (2001, Tortuga)
Christmas (2004, Tortuga)
No (2012, Hydra Head)
The Ape of God (2014, Profound Lore)
The Ape of God (2014, Profound Lore)
Seminar VIII: Light of Meaning (2020, Profound Lore)
Seminar IX: Darkness of Being (2020, Profound Lore)

Extended plays
Christmas Eve I and II + 6 (2003, Tortuga)
Willing Vessel b/w Storms in Our Eyes (2020, Sige)

Live albums
Mickey Rookey Live at London (2016, Ektro)
Zozoburn: Live at Fiesta Roadburn with Zozobra (2020, Sige)

References

External links

Year of birth missing (living people)
Living people
American heavy metal drummers
Musicians from Santa Fe, New Mexico
Old Man Gloom members